Lysine methyltransferase 2E is a protein that in humans is encoded by the  gene.

Function

This gene is a member of the myeloid/lymphoid or mixed-lineage leukemia (MLL) family and encodes a protein with an N-terminal PHD zinc finger and a central SET domain. Overexpression of the protein inhibits cell cycle progression. Alternate transcriptional splice variants have been characterized.

Clinical importance

Mutations in this gene have been associated with intellectual disability, autism, macrocephaly, hypotonia, functional gastrointestinal abnormalities and epilepsy.

References

Further reading